Adi (or Adi Island, Indonesian: Pulau Adi) is an Indonesian island.

It is severed from the Bomberai Peninsula by Nautilus Strait, the narrowest width of which is only . Adi marks the southern border of the Kamrau Bay; beyond lies the open Seram Sea.

References

Islands of Indonesia